Eero Johannes Salisma (16 December 1916 in Hämeenlinna, Finland – 19 July 1998) was a professional ice hockey player who played in the SM-liiga. He played for Hämeenlinnan Tarmo and HPK. He was inducted into the Finnish Hockey Hall of Fame in 1985.

External links
 Finnish Hockey Hall of Fame bio

1916 births
1998 deaths
People from Hämeenlinna
Ice hockey players at the 1952 Winter Olympics
Ice hockey players with retired numbers
Olympic ice hockey players of Finland
Pesäpallo players
Sportspeople from Kanta-Häme